In Search of the Truth is an international, interactive public art project of a touring, inflatable recording booth called 'The Truth Booth'. The Booth is a 16-foot-tall by 23-foot-wide speech bubble that permits visitors to record videos of themselves completing the sentence, "The truth is...". It was established in 2011 as a collaboration between Ryan Alexiev, Hank Willis Thomas and Jim Ricks.

History 

The project was started in 2011 by artists Ryan Alexiev, Hank Willis Thomas and Jim Ricks. Will Sylvester and, now deceased LGBTQ organizer, Jorge Sanchez had joined the project more recently. All are members of the artist collective Cause Collective. In 2011, the project was first shown at the Galway International Arts Festival in Ireland. It debuted in the US during the LOOK3 Festival of the Photograph in Charlottesville, VA in June 2012. 

The project toured Afghanistan in 2013 in a partnership with Free Press Unlimited, a media development organization based in Amsterdam, the Netherlands, and 1TV (Afghan TV channel).  In 2016, it launched a 50-state tour of the United States before the 2016 United States presidential election.  

It has also appeared in South Africa, Australia, and in 2018 toured Mexico from Chiapas to Juarez visiting 20 locations under the name: En Busca de la Verdad. The 'Booth', the Mexican videos, and a documentary about the 2018 tour are part of the Hirshhorn Museum and Sculpture Garden's exhibition Manifesto: Art x Agency showing 2019 – 20. In Search of the Truth was exhibited as part of the Melbourne Fringe Festival in September of 2019 and in October of 2019 the project came to St. Louis and visited Ferguson.

See also 

 Art intervention
Galway International Arts Festival
Public art

References

External links
Official website
 Video of the 'Truth Booth' being installed on The Wall Street Journal
Interview in Smithsonian Magazine with Jim Ricks and Jorge Sanchez, 2019

Interactive art
Projects established in 2011
Public art